Joseph Urie (born 1947) is a Scottish artist living in Glasgow.

Biography
Born in Glasgow in 1947 he trained at the Duncan of Jordanstone College of Art in Dundee from 1977 to 1981 and after working in sculpture attended the Royal Academy Schools from 1981 to 1984, concentrating on painting. He won a number of awards including the Chalmers Jervis Prize and the British Institute Prize in 1980, the Farquhar Reid travelling scholarship in 1981, and the J van Beuren Wittman prize in 1984.

He is an expressionist painter, often autobiographical with use of symbols, rich colours and thick, textured brush strokes. Included in the influential “Vigorous Imagination” exhibition at SNGMA in 1987 along with rising stars Peter Howson, Ken Currie, and Stephen Conroy. His work is included in the City collections of Glasgow, Edinburgh and Dundee.

Works

Art auction results for a number of his works may be found at

Exhibitions
Work on Paper 1978 – 2014, 13 September – 5 October 2014
Sayle Gallery Douglas Isle of Man

References

Living people
1947 births
20th-century Scottish male artists
21st-century Scottish male artists
Alumni of the Royal Academy Schools
Alumni of the University of Dundee
Artists from Glasgow